WDNT (970 AM) is an American radio station broadcasting a classic hits radio format. Licensed to Spring City, Tennessee, United States, the station is currently owned by Beverly Broadcasting Company, LLC and features programming from Fox News Radio.

FM translator
In addition to the main station at 970 kHz, WDNT is relayed to an FM translator at 101.1 MHz. WDNT uses the translator frequency as the main frequency in the logo and branding. The FM translator provides a wider coverage area during nighttime hours when the AM frequency at 970 AM reduces power to only 24 watts. The FM frequency also affords the listener high fidelity sound.

Previous logos

References

External links

DNT (AM)
Classic hits radio stations in the United States
Rhea County, Tennessee
Radio stations established in 1983
1983 establishments in Tennessee